Wesley Carroll may refer to:

Wesley Carroll (quarterback)
Wesley Carroll (wide receiver)
Wes Carroll (born 1970), American beatboxer
Wes Carroll (baseball) (born 1979), American college coach